Donald Ross Rutnam (19 September 1902 – 10 June 1968) was an Indian civil servant and sportsman of Anglo-Ceylonese origin. He was a member of the Ceylon Civil Service and served as the Deputy Commissioner of the Central Provinces and Berar. He represented India in Tennis at the 1924 Summer Olympics and at the Wimbledon Championships.
Born in Colombo, Ceylon, Rutnam was educated at Royal College Colombo where he captained the college cricket team at the Royal–Thomian. He died on 10 June 1968 in Dulwich, United Kingdom.

References

External links
 

1902 births
1968 deaths
Sportspeople from Colombo
Sri Lankan people of British descent
Indian Civil Service (British India) officers
Olympic tennis players of India
Alumni of Royal College, Colombo
Indian people of Sri Lankan descent
Tennis players at the 1924 Summer Olympics
Indian male tennis players
Indian cricketers
Sri Lankan cricketers
Burgher civil servants
Sri Lankan emigrants to the United Kingdom
Indian emigrants to the United Kingdom